The composer Johann Sebastian Bach lived at two addresses during his stay in Köthen, Germany, while he was working for Prince Leopold of Anhalt-Köthen. The first of these properties has been demolished, so Bach House (German: Bachhaus Köthen) normally refers to the extant building which the composer occupied in the period 1719–23. This property is on Wallstraße (Wall Street) and was completed in 1719: Bach is assumed to have been the first tenant of the house. Documentary evidence of the allowances paid to Bach suggests that the house was also used by the court orchestra.

Initially Bach lived in the Wall Street house with first wife, Maria Barbara Bach. She died in 1720, survived by four children. Bach married Anna Magdalena Bach in 1721. In 1723 the Bach family moved to Leipzig.

References

External links

Johann Sebastian Bach
Houses completed in 1719
History of Anhalt
Köthen (Anhalt)
Buildings and structures in Anhalt-Bitterfeld
1719 establishments in the Holy Roman Empire